The Kaliningrad K-5 (NATO reporting name AA-1 Alkali), also known as RS-1U or product ShM, was an early Soviet air-to-air missile.

History
The development of the K-5 began in 1951. The first test firings were in 1953. It was tested (but not operationally carried) by the Yakovlev Yak-25. The weapon entered service as the Grushin/Tomashevich RS-2U (also known as the R-5MS or K-5MS) in 1957. The initial version was matched to the RP-2U (Izumrud-2) radar used on the MiG-17PFU, MiG-19PM. An improved variant, K-5M or RS-2US in PVO service, entered production in 1959, matched to the RP-9/RP-9U (Sapfir) radar of the Sukhoi Su-9. The People's Republic of China developed a copy under the designation PL-1, for use by their J-6B fighters.

The difficulties associated with beam-riding guidance, particularly in a single-seat fighter aircraft, were substantial, making the 'Alkali' primarily a short-range anti-bomber missile. Around 1967 the K-5 was replaced by the K-55 (R-55 in service), which replaced the beam-riding seeker with the semi-active radar homing or infrared seekers of the K-13 (AA-2 'Atoll'). The weapon was  heavier than the K-5, but had a smaller  warhead. The K-55 remained in service through about 1977, probably being retired with the last of the Sukhoi Su-9 interceptors.

Specifications (RS-2US / K-5MS)
 Length: 
 Wingspan: 
 Diameter: 
 Launch weight: 
 Speed: 800 m/s
 Range: 
 Guidance: beam riding
 Warhead:

Operators

Current operator 
North Korea

Used on MiG-21PFM.

Former operators
  Both the Soviet Air Force (VVS) and the Soviet Air Defence Forces (PVO) operated the K-5.
  The People's Liberation Army Air Force operated licensed Chinese copy of Kaliningrad K-5 designated as PL-1 (PL: short for Pi Li or Pili, meaning thunderbolt).
  The Czechoslovakian Air Force operated RS-2U and RS-2US.
  The Hungarian Air Force operated RS-2US on MiG-19PMs, MiG-21PFs and MiG-21MFs.
  Malian Air Force
  The Polish Air Force operated RS-2US on MiG-17PMs, MiG-19PMs and MiG-21s, still in use as practice target.
  Locally produced A-90 copy by Electromecanica Ploiesti (1984)

See also 
 List of missiles

References
Citations

Bibliography

External links

RS-2U - Air-to-Air missile at aviation.ru
K-5 at airwar.ru
K-5  at missiles.ru
- Electromecanica website: Air-to-Air missile

Air-to-air missiles of the Soviet Union
Cold War air-to-air missiles of the Soviet Union
China–Soviet Union relations
Military equipment introduced in the 1950s